Philipp Posch (born 9 January 1994) is an Austrian footballer who plays for USV Mettersdorf.

External links
 

1994 births
People from Judenburg
Living people
Austrian footballers
Association football defenders
Austria youth international footballers
Austria under-21 international footballers
FC Admira Wacker Mödling players
SV Horn players
TSV Hartberg players
Austrian Football Bundesliga players
2. Liga (Austria) players
Austrian Regionalliga players
Footballers from Styria